The 2002 Tecate/Telmex Monterrey Grand Prix was the first round of the 2002 CART FedEx Champ Car World Series season, held on March 10, 2002 at Parque Fundidora in Monterrey, Mexico.

Qualifying results

* Nakano ran his backup car in the qualification 2 session (but was unable to complete a lap), thus forfeiting the qualifying time he set in his primary car on Friday.

Race

Caution flags

Notes 

 New Race Lap Record Cristiano da Matta 1:15.386
 New Race Record Cristiano da Matta 1:58:30.642
 Average Speed 90.544 mph
 CART's first race after the departure of Team Penske for the archrival Indy Racing League.

External links
 Friday Qualifying Results
 Saturday Qualifying Results
 Race Results

Tecate Telmex Monterrey Grand Prix
Grand Prix of Monterrey
21st century in Monterrey
2002 in Mexican motorsport